John W. Cox (March 14, 1888 – September 8, 1958) was an American politician, farmer, and businessman.

Cox was born in Becker, Sherburne County, Minnesota and went to the local public schools and business school. He lived with his wife and family, in Becker, Minnesota, Becker was a farmer and was the owner of a flour mill. Becker served on the Becker Consolidated School Board and on the Becker Township Board of Supervisors. Cox served in the Minnesota House of Representatives from 1935 to 1938 and was a member of the Minnesota Farmer–Labor Party.

References

1888 births
1958 deaths
People from Becker, Minnesota
Millers
Farmers from Minnesota
Businesspeople from Minnesota
Minnesota Farmer–Laborites
School board members in Minnesota
Members of the Minnesota House of Representatives